The Suffolk Show is an annual show that takes place in Trinity Park on the eastern edge of Ipswich in the Purdis Farm area of the English county of Suffolk. It is organised by the Suffolk Agricultural Association (established 1831, registered charity no. 
288595). It was cut short in 2012 with a loss of at least £500,000 in revenue. Day 1 was on Thursday 7 June  2012. and day 2 would have been on Friday 8 June 2012. The Suffolk show offered refunds to ticket-holders and traders for the cancelled second day.

Due to the COVID-19 outbreak, the Suffolk Show was canceled in 2020 and 2021. In 2022, it returned with RAF and Army parachute displays, 600 trade stands, and 12 competition rings.

References

External links 

 

Festivals in Suffolk